Anders Järryd was the defending champion, but lost in the first round to Kenneth Carlsen.

Michael Stich won in the final 4–6, 6–3, 6–0, against Wayne Ferreira.

John McEnroe received a wildcard after not playing on tour since 1992. He lost in the first round. This was the last singles match and tournament of his ATP Tour career.

Seeds

  Michael Stich (champion)
  Goran Ivanišević (semifinals)
  Magnus Gustafsson (second round)
  Boris Becker (first round)
  Wayne Ferreira (final)
  Alexander Volkov (quarterfinals)
  Karel Nováček (second round)
  Jonas Svensson (quarterfinals)

Draw

Finals

Top half

Bottom half

External links
 Draw

Singles